Mean Machine is the name of the yachts and the sailing team owned by Dutch Businessman Peter de Ridder.

The team has a core of crewmembers who’ve been with the team for the last 15 years. Alongside de Ridder, at the heart of the Mean Machine team are internationally renowned sailors who also sail in classes such as the America’s Cup or the Volvo Ocean Race; Tom Dodson and Ray Davies from New Zealand, and Briton Jules Salter.

History
The Mean Machine team starts sailing in 1985 with the Mean Machine one-tonner. Peter de Ridder and an almost entirely amateur team sail into sixth place in the World Championships of the class in the Spanish Island of Mallorca. Since then, with 22 years of sailing history behind them, Mean Machine have notched up some of the most prestigious World and Continental titles, placing them near the top of the world rankings in the sport.

Achievements
Some of their achievements include: 2006 Winners of the Breitling MedCup Circuit (pro and amateur categories); third place in the TP 52 Global Championships, celebrated on the Italian island of Sardinia in September 2007.

In Autumn 2007, the team finished building her newest addition - a Farr 40 One-Design, number 21 in the series of Mean Machine competition sailing boats. Winter 2007/08 will see the launch of an even newer Mean Machine, a TP 52 to replace the one that Peter de Ridder and crew sailed to victory on in the 2006 MedCup circuit.

2007
Hyéres Trophy - 6th 
2007 Breitling MedCup - 5th
TP52 Rolex Global Championship - 3rd
Trofeo Portugal - 1st on the Overall Classification and also 1st on the Corinthian
Regatta Breitling - 9th
Copa del Rey Trophy - 9th
Trofeo Alicante - 1st in Corinthian and 2nd on the overall classification
North Sea Regatta - Winner & Record Breaker VO70
Key West Race Week - 2nd Mumm 30 Class
Acura Miami Race Week - Winners Mumm 30 Class
Hublot Palmavela - Winners TP 52 Class

2006
Winner Miami Race Week Mumm30
Punta Ala Trophy 2nd TP52 class
Trofeo Castellon 3rd TP52 class
Winner Breitling Trophy TP52 class
Copa del Rey 5th TP52 class
Winner Athens Trophy TP52 class
Winner Trofeo Ibiza TP52 Class
Overall Winner of TP52 Breitling MedCup Circuit
Mumm30 Worlds 4th overall

For further results see team website Mean Machine

Boats
The team is well known for its trademark characteristics: over the last few years the boats have all had black hulls, with pink flames rising up the bow.

References
Yachting World (Spain): Oct 2007 - p. 24 "Mean Machine prepara su asalto a la clase Farr 40"
ABC Newspaper (Spain): 28/11/07 - Interview with Peter de Ridder "Cuanto más dura es la competición más dulce es la victoria"
Levante Mercantil Valenciano Newspaper (Spain): 28/04/07 "Palma disfruta la Hublot)

External links
MedCup results 2007
MedCup results 2006
ISAF: International Sailing Federation article
Mumm 30 results Accura Miami Grand Prix 2007

Sailing teams